GAV, also known as Gav News It is a multilingual news agency and delivers political, economic and social news from Kurdistan, Iraq and the Middle East to the public.

Kurdistan region has become an important center of political and economic developments in the Middle East, that is why has attracted the attention of the journalists of Gav and aims to reach the public with the right and impartial news from the region. a number of expert journalists from different districts of Kurdistan work for Gav and main office in Duhok. Gav makes special news in Iraqi Kurdistan. Gav provides photographs of expert photographers who documenting important developments and events in Kurdistan. Gav is connecting with all those agencies, journalists, and international agencies that focus on the region.

Website 
Gav provides news online in Kurdish Sorani and Kurmanji, English. Their websites covers news in Kurdistan, the Middle East, and internationally. Additionally, Gav provides coverage of culture, sports, and economy in Kurdistan and abroad. It also offers its readers a section for original interviews, as well as transcriptions of interviews after they've been aired on the television network. The network also provides readers with regular analysis and opinion pieces covering relevant issues in the Kurdistan Region and the Middle East.

External links 

 Gav website

References 

Kurdish-language newspapers